Proteins are a class of biomolecules composed of amino acid chains.

Biochemistry
 Antifreeze protein, class of polypeptides produced by certain fish, vertebrates, plants, fungi and bacteria
 Conjugated protein, protein that functions in interaction with other chemical groups attached by covalent bonds
 Denatured protein, protein which has lost its functional conformation
 Matrix protein, structural protein linking the viral envelope with the virus core
 Protein A, bacterial surface protein that binds antibodies
 Protein A/G, recombinant protein that binds antibodies
 Protein C, anticoagulant
 Protein G, bacterial surface protein that binds antibodies
 Protein L, bacterial surface protein that binds antibodies
 Protein S, plasma glycoprotein
 Protein Z, glycoprotein
 Protein catabolism, the breakdown of proteins into amino acids and simple derivative compounds
 Protein complex, group of two or more associated proteins
 Protein electrophoresis, method of analysing a mixture of proteins by means of gel electrophoresis
 Protein folding, process by which a protein assumes its characteristic functional shape or tertiary structure
 Protein isoform, version of a protein with some small differences
 Protein kinase, enzyme that modifies other proteins by chemically adding phosphate groups to them
 Protein ligands, atoms, molecules, and ions which can bind to specific sites on proteins
 Protein microarray, piece of glass on which different molecules of protein have been affixed at separate locations in an ordered manner
 Protein phosphatase, enzyme that removes phosphate groups that have been attached to amino acid residues of proteins
 Protein purification, series of processes intended to isolate a single type of protein from a complex mixture
 Protein sequencing, protein method
 Protein splicing, intramolecular reaction of a particular protein in which an internal protein segment is removed from a precursor protein
 Protein structure, unique three-dimensional shape of amino acid chains
 Protein targeting, mechanism by which a cell transports proteins to the appropriate positions in the cell or outside of it
 Protein-protein docking, the determination of the molecular structure of complexes formed by two or more proteins
 Protein-protein interaction, the association of protein molecules and the study of these associations from the perspective of biochemistry
 RACK protein, receptor responsible for the binding of active forms of the protein kinase C family of enzymes
 Secretory protein, protein which is secreted by a cell

Bioengineering
 Protein production, the generation of a pure protein
 Protein design, the design of new protein molecules from scratch
 Protein engineering, application of science, mathematics, and economics to the process of developing useful or valuable proteins

Genetics
 Fibrous protein, long filamentous protein molecule that forms one of the two main classes of tertiary structure protein
 Fusion protein, protein created through genetic engineering from two or more proteins
 Globular protein, one of the two main protein classes
 Protein family, group of evolutionarily related proteins
 Protein methods, techniques used to study proteins
 Protein subunit, single protein molecule that assembles with other protein molecules to form a multimeric or oligomeric protein
 Regulatory protein, term used in genetics to describe a protein involved in regulating gene expression

Medicine
 Tau protein, microtubule-associated protein found in neurons in the brain

Membrane biology
 G protein, family of proteins involved in second messenger cascades
 Membrane protein, protein molecule that is attached to, or associated with, the membrane of a cell or an organelle
 Transmembrane protein, integral membrane protein that spans from the internal to the external surface of the biological membrane
 Transport protein, protein involved in the movement of a chemical across a biological membrane

Nutrition
 Carbohydrates (nutrient), role of protein in nutrition
 Soy protein, storage protein held in discrete particles called protein bodies
 Whey protein, the name for a collection of globular proteins that can be isolated from whey

See also
 Protein K (disambiguation)
 Protein synthesis
 Protein-coated

 
Protein